These are the official results of the Men's Javelin Throw event at the 1991 World Championships in Tokyo, Japan. There were a total of 41 participating athletes, with the final held on Monday August 26, 1991. All results were made with rough surfaced javelin. The qualification mark was set at 82.00 metres.

Medalists

Schedule
All times are Japan Standard Time (UTC+9)

Abbreviations
All results shown are in metres

Records

Qualification

Group A

Group B

Final

See also
 1988 Men's Olympic Javelin Throw (Seoul)
 1990 Men's European Championships Javelin Throw (Split)
 1992 Men's Olympic Javelin Throw (Barcelona)
 1994 Men's European Championships Javelin Throw (Helsinki)

References
 Results
 koti.welho

J
Javelin throw at the World Athletics Championships